The Connoisseur (by Mr. Town [pseud.], Critic, and Censor-General. 2 vols. 140 nos. (31 January 1754 – 30 September 1756)), was a London weekly eighteenth century newspaper founded and chiefly run by George Colman the Elder and the parodist Bonnell Thornton as a 'plebeian' counterpart to Edward Moore's The World, a periodical of about the same time, which dealt more with the interests of aristocrats. James Boswell says in his Life of Johnson:

Further reading
 The Connoisseur. v.1 (1754)
 A. Chalmers. "Historical and biographical preface to The Connoisseur." British Essayists, v.30. London: 1817

References

Defunct newspapers published in the United Kingdom
Defunct weekly newspapers
Publications established in 1754
Publications disestablished in 1756
1754 establishments in England
Newspapers published in London